Prof Robert Dyce FRSE (1798–1869) was a Scottish surgeon and Professor of Midwifery at Aberdeen University.

Life

He was born in Aberdeen on 30 November 1798 the son of Dr William Dyce of Fonthill and Cuttlehill (1770–1835) and his wife Margaret Chalmers Dyce (1776–1856). His early years were spent at 48 Marischal Street. His younger brother was the artist William Dyce. His uncle was General Alexander Dyce of the East India Company.
He studied Medicine at Aberdeen University with additional studies in both Edinburgh and London. He enlisted in the army at the Military Hospital at Chatham and joined the medical staff in Mauritius in 1821, also serving in the Cape of Good Hope until 1833. From 1833 to 1836 he worked in a military hospital at Maidstone in Kent. In 1836 he returned to Aberdeen as a GP, also lecturing in midwifery at the university from 1841. From 1860 until death he served as Professor of Midwifery at Aberdeen University. In 1864 he was elected a Fellow of the Royal Society of Edinburgh, his proposer being Cosmo Innes.

In later life he lived at 16 Union Terrace in Aberdeen.

He died in Edinburgh on 11 January 1869. He is buried with his parents in the churchyard of the Kirk of St Nicholas on Union Street in Aberdeen. The grave lies south of the church.

Family

His nephew (sister’s son) was the engineer William Dyce Cay.

References

1798 births
1869 deaths
19th-century Scottish medical doctors
Fellows of the Royal Society of Edinburgh
People from Aberdeen
Alumni of the University of Aberdeen
Academics of the University of Aberdeen